A list of American films released in 1902.

See also
 1902 in the United States

External links

1902 films at the Internet Movie Database

1902
Films
American
1900s in American cinema